Lewry is a surname. Notable people with the surname include:

Jason Lewry (born 1971), English cricketer
Osmund Lewry (1929–1987), English Dominican
Scoop Lewry (1919–1992), Canadian politician and reporter

See also
Lawry
Lewy (surname)